Septembre et Ses Dernières Pensées is the debut album from French band Les Discrets. It was released on 26 March 2010 through Prophecy Productions.

Track listing

Personnel

Les Discrets 
 Fursy Teyssier - lead vocals, guitars, bass
 Audrey Hadorn - vocals
 Winterhalter - drums

Production 
 Neb Xort - recording and mixing
 Fursy Teyssier - artwork and design
 Andy Julia - band pictures

References

External links
 Les Discrets official website
 Prophecy Productions

Les Discrets albums
2010 albums